The Basilicata regional election of 2005 took place on 17–18 April 2005.

Due to some legal issues with the presentation of the list of Social Alternative, Basilicata did not vote along with the other Italian regions in the 3-4 April 2005 regional elections, but a couple of weeks later instead, on 17–18 April 2005. The victory of The Union coalition, which obtained more than two thirds of the vote, was the largest in Italy and Vito De Filippo (DL) was elected President by a landslide.

Results

Elections in Basilicata
2005 elections in Italy